Cooperative Farm 2 ( – Mazra‘eh-ye Tʿāvanī Ānqolāb Shomāreh-ye Do) is a village and cooperative farm in Howmeh Rural District, in the Central District of Semnan County, Semnan Province, Iran. At the 2006 census, its population was 56, in 18 families.

References 

Populated places in Semnan County